Beata Hlavenková, née Morávková (born 2 February 1978) is a Czech composer, singing pianist, arranger and producer. In June 2020 Hlavenková received award as a Best female singer at Anděl Awards 2019.

Discography

Studio albums
S'aight (2004)
Eternal Seekers (2008)
Joy for Joel (2009)
Eternal Seekers (2012) (reedition from 2008)
Theodoros (2013)
Pišlické příběhy (2015)
Scintilla (2015)
Bethlehem (2017)
Sně (2019)
Žijutě (2021)

References

External links

1978 births
Living people
21st-century Czech women singers
Czech composers
Czech women pianists
University of Massachusetts alumni
21st-century pianists
21st-century women pianists